The Cathedral of St. George Historic District encompasses a historic church complex at 517-523-525 East Broadway in South Boston, Massachusetts.  The church building was designed by Boston architect Samuel J. F. Thayer and was built in 1872 to house a Unitarian congregation.  The polychrome Gothic Revival structure was acquired in 1949 by the Albanian Orthodox Archdiocese of the Orthodox Church in America.  The complex also includes two brick houses, 517 and 525 East Broadway, which were built about the same time as the church, and were owned by the Unitarian congregation.

The complex was listed on the National Register of Historic Places in 1998.

See also
 Saint George: Devotions, traditions and prayers
National Register of Historic Places listings in southern Boston, Massachusetts

References

External links
the Cathedral's web site

Albanian-American culture in Massachusetts
Albanian-American history
Churches completed in 1868
19th-century Eastern Orthodox church buildings
Historic districts in Suffolk County, Massachusetts
Eastern Orthodox churches in Massachusetts
Churches in Boston
South Boston
National Register of Historic Places in Boston
Historic districts on the National Register of Historic Places in Massachusetts